Machine tending refers to the automated operation of industrial machine tools in a manufacturing plant, primarily using robot automation systems. While loading and unloading is the primary function of machine tending systems, often the robot performs other valuable functions within the automation system such as part inspection, blow off, wash, deburring, sorting, packaging and gauging.

Benefits of machine tending systems include:

 increased productivity
 decreased manufacturing labor
 decreased overall costs
 improved quality
 enhanced safety
 operational flexibility
 inventory optimization

Because of the sophistication, functionality, and costs associated with machine tending systems, most manufacturers require a capital approval process prior to investing in these systems where executive management must approve the purchase. Typically, an ROI (return on investment) is calculated to justify the purchase.

Industrial automation